Luis Segura (born in Mao, Dominican Republic year 1939), is a popular traditional Dominican singer who refers to himself as 'The Father of Bachata'. He is considered one of the best interpreters of traditional bachata with hits like "Pena por ti", "Dicen", and "No me celes tanto". Segura's first recordings were in the 1960s but it wasn't until his release of "Pena por ti" in the early 1970s that Segura hit stardom.

Discography 
 Luis Segura y Su Conjunto (1966)

 Escondida
 Me Siento Convencido
 Carmencita
 Yo Me Creía
 Tanto Que Sufro
 Aunque Todas Me Desprecien
 El Día Que Yo Nací
 No Te Vayas
 Qué Soledad
 Cuando Se Quiere Mucho
 Muchachita de Mi Vida
 Me Duele Decirte

 En Nueva York (1964)

 No Me Tortures
 Cariñito de Mi Vida
 Yo No Culpo a Nadie
 Siempre Te Recuerdo a Ti
 Abre Mi Pecho
 Donde Tú Estás
 Cuando Estoy Cerca de Ti
 Tú Eres Mi Vida
 Tú No Me Quieres a Mi
 Que Me Castigue Dios

 tu sabes (1965)

 Tú Sabes
 Dime la Verdad
 Llanto
 Ven Que Me Muero
 Por Esos Caminos
 Me Estás Acabando
 Ten Compasión de Mí
 ¿Por Qué Dudas de Mí?
 Mi Noche Triste
 Esta Navidad

 La Copa Rota (1973)

 Esa Mujer
 Tú Eres Mi Hembra
 Mi Palomita
 Olvida
 Cuando Miro Su Retrato
 La Copa Rota
 Lucero de Medianoche
 Vete
 Como el Álamo al Camino
 Mentiras Tuyas

 Perdido (1981)

 Perdido
 Ya No Me Importa Nada
 No Soy Feliz
 Eres Tú Cuando Caminas
 Quién Podrá
 Por Eso Debes Sufrir
 Dónde Está Ella
 Yo No Sé lo Que Me Pasa
 Dios Mío No Nos Desampares
 Si Será Como un Castigo
 No Voy a Llorar
 Tengo que Olvidarte

 Pena por Ti (1982)

 Pena por Ti
 Déjame Ya
 Mi Muchachita
 Siéntate en Mi Mesa
 No Me Celes Tanto
 Se Rompió la Cadena
 Yo Encontré lo que Buscaba
 Dicen
 Yo Quiero Hablarte
 Amor por Ti

 Vol. 2 (1974)

 Vete
 Tu Nombre
 Recuérdame
 Arrodíllate
 Corazón de Acero
 Rayito de Sol
 Por Dos Caminos
 Como el Álamo al Camino
 Pero Piénsalo
 Súplica

 Canciones de Amargue (1979)

 Por un Poco de Tu Amor
 Te Da Mucho Calor
 Perdóname Señor
 Mami
 Ya No Te Quiero
 Hoy Me Toca Reír
 Por Qué Razón
 No Me Dejas Vivir
 Si Vuelves a Salir
 Celos Sin Razón

 No Te Separes de Mí (1980)

 Penitencia
 Que Agonía
 Los Obreros
 No Te Separes de Mí
 No Me Hagas Sufrir Tanto
 Tú Me Necesitas
 Pasemos Este Momento
 Me Tienes Loco
 Lucero Que Alumbra el Día
 No Me Molestes

 Me Dicen el Amargado Vol. 5 (1983)

 Me Dicen el Amargado
 La Felicidad
 Te Esperaré
 El Prendedor
 El Día Que Nací Yo
 Cuando Estoy Contigo
 Nadie lo Debe Saber
 No Mereces Que Te Mire
 Si Me Dejas No Vale
 Que Triste

 En Grande (1984)

 Pero Que Navidad
 Por Qué Bailas con Él
 La Canción de Mis Recuerdos
 Yo Te Necesito
 Aunque Me Mate de Pena
 Por un Puñado de Plata
 Adelante Merengue
 No Quiero Que Te Vayas
 La Situación
 Quédate con Tu Dinero

 Me Dejaste Solo (1983)

 Me Dejaste Solo
 Corazón de Acero
 Consejo de un Amigo
 El Gran Bohemio
 Para Mí No Hay Navidad
 Tu Nombre
 Recuérdame
 Piénsalo Bien
 Súplica
 Arrodíllate

 El Añoñaito! (1987)

 Dime Que Me Quieres
 Me Muero por Ella
 No Soy Malo
 Que Murmuren
 No Puedo Más
 Ya lo Sé Que Te Vas
 Ya Te Olvidé
 Nuestro Juramento
 Ahora Que Quieres
 Presentimientos

 Qué Destino (1989)

 La Cobardía
 Qué Destino
 Qué Tú Tienes
 Solo
 Ahora en Esta Barra
 Yo No Sé
 Ya Están Diciendo
 Amada Mía
 Qué Sé Yo
 Cada Día

 15 Éxitos de Luis Segura (1990)

 Pena por Ti
 Déjame Ya
 Mi Muchachita
 Siéntate en Mi Mesa
 No Me Celes Tanto
 Se Rompió la Cadena
 Yo Encontré lo que Buscaba
 Dicen
 Yo Quiero Hablarte
 Amor por Ti
 Corazón de Acero
 Como el Álamo al Camino
 Rayito de Sol
 Tu Nombre
 Recuérdame

 20 Grandes Éxitos (1992)

Vol. 1 

 Cariñito de Mi Vida
 Siempre Te Recuerdo a Ti
 Donde Tú Estás
 Que Me Castigue Dios
 Abre Mi Pecho
 Yo No Culpo a Nadie
 Que Destino
 Ahora Estoy en la Barra
 Yo No Sé
 Tú Sabes

Vol. 2 

 Ven Que Me Muero
 Dime la Verdad
 Mi Noche Triste
 Me Estás Acabando
 ¿Por Qué Dudas de Mí?
 Ten Compasión de Mí
 Amada Mía
 Por Esos Caminos
 Ya Están Diciendo
 Llanto

 Vol. 2 (1993)

 Vete
 Súplica 
 Arrodíllate
 Por Dos Caminos
 Pero Piénsalo
 Escondida
 Me Siento Convencido
 Qué Soledad
 Yo Me Creía
 Tanto Que Sufro
 Aunque Todos Me Desprecien
 El Día Que Nací Yo
 No Te Vayas
 Carmencita
 Cuando Se Quiere Mucho
 Muchachita de Mi Vida
 Me Duele Decirte

 El Papá de la Bachata (1994)

 Tú No Te Atreves
 Ámame
 Que Quieres Tú de Mi
 Por Qué Huyes
 Toda la Vida
 Mamita
 Dime
 Una Más
 El Primer Beso
 Junto a Mí

 Todo... Sentimiento (1995)

 Déjame   
 Qué Será   
 Que No    
 Dónde Estará    
 Brindemos por Ella    
 Te Vas    
 Amor    
 Tiempo Que Se Va / No Vuelve    
 Quítame Esta Pena  
 Empecemos de Nuevo

 Como Yo (1998)

 Como Yo
 Una Chica Como Tú
 Traicionera
 Si Supieras
 Ay Morena 
 No Te Voy a Dejar
 Para Qué Llorar
 Casado y Loco
 Serenata
 Por Qué Sufrir

 La Razón de Mi Vida (1999)

 Los Celos
 No Puedo Dejarte de Amar
 No Puedo Más
 La Quiero
 Qué Te He Hecho
 Afincao
 Ese Mequetrefe
 Amor y Fantasía
 No Me Digas Adiós
 La Razón de Mi Vida
 Desde Que Te Fuiste
 Afincao (Mix)

 Cosas de la Vida (2000)

 Me la Pagarás 
 Bájate de Esa Nube 
 Porque Moriré 
 Dos Mujeres 
 Cosas de la Vida 
 Cuando Estoy Contigo
 Vuelve a Casa 
 No Puedo
 Ay Mami
 Decídete Ya

 Hasta Cuándo (2001)

 Ella Se Fue
 Déjenme Llorar
 Hasta Cuándo
 Me Robaste el Alma
 Por Tu Culpa
 Nunca Eres Feliz
 Qué Ganas con Llorar
 La Fe Verdadera
 Ay Corazón
 Por Qué Te Sigo Amando

 Te Perdono (2002)

 Pena, Penita
 Dímelo
 No Digas Nada (Bachata)
 No Puedo Perdonarte
 Por Ella
 Te Perdono (Bachata)
 Prefiero la Muerte
 No Digas Nada (Bolero)
 Te Perdono (Bolero)
 No Mereces Que Te Mire
 Perdóname    
 No Me Hablen Más de Ella

 Yo Volveré (2007)

 Maldigo la Hora
 Ya No Creo en Ti
 Nuestro Amor Es Complicado
 Qué Destino
 Popurrí de Éxitos del Ayer
 Si Tú Te Me Vas
 Yo Volveré
 Ay Qué Pena
 Lo Averiguaré
 Ejemplo de Amor
 Madre
 Amarte en Silencio

 Con Sus Éxitos

 No Te Vayas
 Yo Te Buscaba
 Otro Escándalo
 Te Necesito
 No Me Quiten la Botella
 Me Siento Convencido
 Qué Soledad
 Cuando Se Quiere Mucho
 Muchachita de Mi Vida
 Me Duele Decirte

References 

Living people
People from Santa Cruz de Mao
Bachata singers
1940 births
20th-century Dominican Republic male singers
Dominican Republic songwriters
Male songwriters
Spanish-language singers
21st-century Dominican Republic male singers